Whiteford Township is a civil township of Monroe County in the U.S. state of Michigan. The population was 4,602 at the 2010 census.

Communities
 Gert is a former community within the township.  It had its own post office from February 16, 1885 until March 31, 1904.  Gert can be seen within Whiteford Township on a 1911 map of Monroe County.
Ottawa Lake has its own post office with the 49267 ZIP Code, which serves the majority of the township.
 Pleasant View is a former community within the township.  It appeared along the Toledo, Ann Arbor and North Michigan Railway line and can be seen in section 36 on an 1876 map of Whiteford Township.
The community was settled in 1920 as a location between Ottawa Lake and Temperance.
 Whiteford was the original settlement of Whiteford Township when it was organized in 1834.  The Whiteford post office was established on June 2, 1835 but was quickly transferred to Toledo on September 19, which was then still part of Monroe County in the Michigan Territory.
It was settled as early as 1840 and contained its own post office from June 26, 1867 until September 30, 1905.

Early history
Whiteford Township was organized in March 1834 and carved out of western parts of Erie Township and the former Port Lawrence Township. It was named after Gen. David White, the township's first supervisor and a pioneer settler. At the time of founding, Whiteford Township was a much larger township in land area than it is today. It originally extended into present-day Ohio, when that part of the state (known as the Toledo Strip) was claimed by both Ohio and Michigan during the Toledo War. This larger Whiteford Township included most of present-day Sylvania, Sylvania Township, northern Springfield Township and a small section of present-day Toledo north of Airport Highway between Reynolds Road and Holland-Sylvania. However, by December 1836, the boundary dispute between Ohio and Michigan had been settled, the Toledo Strip was awarded to Ohio, and Whiteford Township subsequently lost all of its territory south of this newly agreed upon state boundary.

Throughout the mid and late 19th Century, most of the land in the township was used agriculturally with many of the square-mile sections divided up into parcels of 40 to 160 acres.  In 1880, over 95% of the householders residing there were occupied as farmers or farm laborers. Merchants and manufacturers could be found in the unincorporated settlements of Whiteford Center and Ottawa Lake, the latter being home to a large stave mill in which residents were employed during the 1870s and 1880s.

In 1880, the total population of the township was 2044 of which 2030 residents were classified as White and 14 were listed as Black/Mulatto. By 1900 the population had risen to 2050, with all residents listed as White.

Geography

Major highways

Demographics
As of the census of 2000, there were 4,420 people, 1,582 households, and 1,243 families residing in the township. The racial makeup of the township was 95.41% White, 1.97% African American, 0.07% Native American, 0.20% Asian, 1.49% from other races, and 0.86% from two or more races. Hispanic or Latino of any race were 2.49% of the population.

There were 1,582 households, out of which 35.0% had children under the age of 18 living with them, 69.4% were married couples living together, 6.3% had a female householder with no husband present, and 21.4% were non-families. 18.1% of all households were made up of individuals, and 6.3% had someone living alone who was 65 years of age or older.  The average household size was 2.77 and the average family size was 3.17.

In the township the population was spread out, with 26.2% under the age of 18, 7.4% from 18 to 24, 28.1% from 25 to 44, 27.4% from 45 to 64, and 10.9% who were 65 years of age or older.  The median age was 39 years. For every 100 females, there were 103.9 males.  For every 100 females age 18 and over, there were 100.9 males.

The median income for a household in the township was $56,280, and the median income for a family was $61,667. Males had a median income of $47,950 versus $26,275 for females. The per capita income for the township was $21,899.  About 3.1% of families and 5.1% of the population were below the poverty line, including 4.6% of those under age 18 and 4.6% of those age 65 or over.

Images

References

Sources

External links
 Whiteford Township Official website
 Whiteford Township Fire Department

Townships in Monroe County, Michigan
Townships in Michigan
Populated places established in 1834
1834 establishments in Michigan Territory